The 1982 Wimbledon Championships was a tennis tournament played on grass courts at the All England Lawn Tennis and Croquet Club in Wimbledon, London in the United Kingdom. The tournament ran from 21 June until 4 July. It was the 96th staging of the Wimbledon Championships, and the second Grand Slam tennis event of 1982.

Prize money
The total prize money for 1982 championships was £593,366. The winner of the men's title earned £41,664 while the women's singles champion earned £37,500.

* per team

Champions

Seniors

Men's singles

 Jimmy Connors defeated  John McEnroe, 3–6, 6–3, 6–7(2–7), 7–6(7–5), 6–4
 It was Connors's 6th career Grand Slam title and his 2nd and last Wimbledon title.

Women's singles

 Martina Navratilova defeated  Chris Evert Lloyd, 6–1, 3–6, 6–2
 It was Navratilova's 15th career Grand Slam title and her 3rd Wimbledon title.

Men's doubles

 Peter McNamara /  Paul McNamee defeated  Peter Fleming /  John McEnroe, 6–3, 6–2
 It was McNamara's 3rd and last career Grand Slam title and his 2nd Wimbledon title. It was McNamee's 3rd career Grand Slam title and his 2nd and last Wimbledon title.

Women's doubles

 Martina Navratilova /  Pam Shriver defeated  Kathy Jordan /  Anne Smith, 6–4, 6–1
 It was Navratilova's 16th career Grand Slam title and her 7th Wimbledon title. It was Shriver's 2nd career Grand Slam title and her 2nd Wimbledon title.

Mixed doubles

 Kevin Curren /  Anne Smith defeated  John Lloyd /  Wendy Turnbull, 2–6, 6–3, 7–5
 It was Curren's 2nd career Grand Slam title and his only Wimbledon title. It was Smith's 8th career Grand Slam title and her 2nd Wimbledon title.

Juniors

Boys' singles

 Pat Cash defeated  Henrik Sundström, 6–4, 6–7(5–7), 6–3

Girls' singles

 Catherine Tanvier defeated  Helena Suková, 6–2, 7–5

Boys' doubles

 Pat Cash /  John Frawley defeated  Rick Leach /  John Ross, 6–3, 6–4

Girls' doubles

 Penny Barg /  Beth Herr defeated  Barbara Gerken /  Gretchen Rush, 6–1, 6–4

Singles seeds

Men's singles
  John McEnroe (final, lost to Jimmy Connors)
  Jimmy Connors (champion)
  Vitas Gerulaitis (quarterfinals, lost to Mark Edmondson)
  Sandy Mayer (third round, lost to Tim Mayotte)
  Johan Kriek (quarterfinals, lost to John McEnroe)
  Gene Mayer (quarterfinals, lost to Jimmy Connors)
  Mats Wilander (fourth round, lost to Brian Teacher)
  Peter McNamara (first round, lost to Chip Hooper)
  Andrés Gómez (first round, lost to Stan Smith)
  Yannick Noah (withdrew before the tournament began)
  Brian Teacher (quarterfinals, lost to Tim Mayotte)
  Mark Edmondson (semifinals, lost to Jimmy Connors)
  Brian Gottfried (second round, lost to Nick Saviano)
  Roscoe Tanner (fourth round, lost to Vitas Gerulaitis)
  Buster Mottram (fourth round, lost to Tim Mayotte)
  Steve Denton (fourth round, lost to Gene Mayer)

Women's singles
  Martina Navratilova (champion)
  Chris Evert Lloyd (final, lost to Martina Navratilova)
  Tracy Austin (quarterfinals, lost to Billie Jean King)
  Andrea Jaeger (fourth round, lost to Anne Smith)
  Hana Mandlíková (second round, lost to Candy Reynolds)
  Wendy Turnbull (fourth round, lost to Billie Jean King)
  Pam Shriver (fourth round, lost to Barbara Potter)
  Mima Jaušovec (second round, lost to JoAnne Russell)
  Sylvia Hanika (fourth round, lost to JoAnne Russell)
  Barbara Potter (quarterfinals, lost to Chris Evert Lloyd)
  Bettina Bunge (semifinals, lost to Martina Navratilova)
  Billie Jean King (semifinals, lost to Chris Evert Lloyd)
  Anne Smith (quarterfinals, lost to Bettina Bunge)
  Andrea Leand (second round, lost to Claudia Kohde)
  Virginia Ruzici (fourth round, lost to Chris Evert Lloyd)
  Evonne Goolagong Cawley (second round, lost to Zina Garrison)

References

External links
 Official Wimbledon Championships website

 
Wimbledon Championships
Wimbledon Championships
June 1982 sports events in the United Kingdom
July 1982 sports events in the United Kingdom